Martina Hingis and Sania Mirza were the defending champions, but chose not to participate together. Hingis played alongside CoCo Vandeweghe, but lost in the second round to Aleksandra Krunić and Kateřina Siniaková.

Mirza teamed up with Barbora Strýcová, but lost in the final to Bethanie Mattek-Sands and Lucie Šafářová, 1–6, 4–6.

Seeds
The top four seeds received a bye into the second round.

Draw

Finals

Top half

Bottom half

External links 
 Draw

Doubles